Arturo Longton Herrera (born 1978) is a Chilean television personality who has gained notoriety for his featuring in 2000s or 2010s Chilean reality shows as well as in the movies of Stefan Kramer, where he was portrayed by the same impressionist and is situated alongside Miguel Piñera, brother of Sebastián Piñera, twice president of Chile.

He came from a family heavily linked to politics, in which his father was mayor and deputy as well as his mother. Similarly, his brother, Andrés, currently is deputy.

One of his most regarded appearances was his participation in the reality show La Granja (The Farm).

Filmography

Reality shows

Films

References

External links
 
 

1978 births
Living people
Chilean television personalities
Reality television participants
People from Viña del Mar